Industrial Property Office may refer to:
 Netherlands Industrial Property Office
 Norwegian Industrial Property Office

See also 
 Intellectual Property Office (disambiguation)
 Intellectual property organization
 National Industrial Property Institute (disambiguation)
 INPI (disambiguation)
 Patent office